Sir Ernest Thomas Harrison  (11 May 1926 – 16 February 2009) was an English businessman. He was best known as chairman of electronics company Racal and the first chairman of its spun-out mobile telephony division, Vodafone.

References

External links
Obituary at The Daily Telegraph

People from Hackney Central
Fleet Air Arm personnel of World War II
Businesspeople awarded knighthoods
English accountants
Racal
British racehorse owners and breeders
Officers of the Order of the British Empire
Knights Bachelor
1926 births
2009 deaths
Chairmen of Vodafone
British chief executives
British corporate directors
British chairpersons of corporations
20th-century English businesspeople